Helions Bumpstead is a small village in Essex located near Haverhill and the Suffolk and Cambridgeshire borders. It is 2 miles from Steeple Bumpstead. Helions Bumpstead has "the greens"; Pale Green, Wiggens Green, and Drapers Green. There are four roads into and out of the village, they are; Mill Road, Water Lane, Sages End Road and Camps Road. The centre of the village is marked by the crossroads and village green. There is also a meadow with a pond in the centre of the village.

The Village
The main defining features of the village are the village post office, the village hall, the 3 Horseshoes Public House and St Andrew's Church; the village is in the Diocese of Chelmsford and shares its priest with St Mary's, Steeple Bumpstead. There is also a Gospel Hall in the village. The church has a ring of 8 bells. 

The Three Horseshoes Public House was purchased by the community in March 2019 through a community share offer managed by the Helions Bumpstead Community Benefit Society.  The pub underwent refurbishment and operated initially for the benefit of the community during the Covid 19 pandemic as a shop and then for Friday evening openings run by volunteers.  In December 2021 the pub reopened fully when the Community Benefit Society appointed professional tenants. 

The village hall has recently been undergoing refurbishment with money raised over the years from events and grants given to the village. The hall has had the interior stage removed to increase the space for functions; been given a new slate tile pitched roof; been repainted; and, more recently, had an extension to the storage area.

Every year Helions Bumpstead has its own Summer Fête, including a Dog Show and evening party, and Christmas Bazaar. A harvest supper is also organised annually to raise funds for the up-keep of St. Andrew's church. A farmers' market showcasing local produce was once held every third Saturday of the month in the village hall. The Helions Bumpstead Village Magazine is printed quarterly, compiled of news articles and pieces of writing by villagers. It is subsidised by the sale of advertising space, which also adds to funds for the village hall.

One of the most famous WW2 planes called the Mosquito was tested on the airfield near Castle Camps. Many of the hangars the planes were built in can still be seen today.

The actor Norman Pierce, known for his role as Jim Sturry in the 1942 Ealing Studios film Went the Day Well?, as well as many other roles in films including Saloon Bar, The Four Feathers and The Life and Death of Colonel Blimp, was a resident of Helion Bumpstead and died there in 1968 aged 67.

There is an annual Boxing Day walk, when people meet up at the Three Horseshoes car park and, each year, walk a different route around the village.

The Silver Jubilee of Her Majesty Elizabeth II marked the presentation of a village sign, including the village symbol (a red badge with a white diagonal cross) which stands in centre of the village. At the time of the Queen's Golden Jubilee, the village held a large fair in her honour. A board featuring photographs of the event was put up inside the village hall to commemorate it. These pictures are no longer on display.

History
From Portrait of Helions Bumpstead by Roy Brazier
Helions Bumpstead was well known to historians in the time of Edward the Confessor, before the Norman Conquest. Then the whole area of which we know now as Steeple and Helions Bumpstead, was called collectively Bumsteda, or variations of this earliest way of spelling. As more people drifted into this area, two distinct centres developed, with the Helions part taking on the title of Bumpstead Magna (Great) and the Steeple district Bumpstead Parva (Little).

Bumsteda is not an easy name to sort out. History books tell us it means `a place where flax or hemp grows'. This could well be true, as several osier beds were discovered in parts of the village, such as Bumpstead Hall and Drapers Green. It is in the Sages End area where a spring, called the `Dropping Well', was the source of the best water in the village. It was noted as running at four gallons a minute in a report by Dr. Hubert Airy in 1871 when he visited the village to investigate the poor sanitary state that existed there. Even in the summer months the spring ran nearly two gallons each minute, enticing the inhabitants of Castle Camps to walk there when really hot weather dried up their watering holes. `Dropping Well' was the source of much of Helions Bumpstead's water, as it made its way down Sages End road to join the main rivulet near the crossroads, thence to flow eastward into the River Stour and to the sea at Harwich.

The village history seems to take off from William the Conqueror and the compiling of the Domesday Book. The new King of England rewarded an officer of his invading army by granting him the Manor of Bumpstead. The officer, named Tihell, came from a village in France named Hellean, in the Morhihan district of Brittany. It was here in England that he built a Manor House on a hill facing due east, and then on a small mound not half a mile away, he built his church. In the seventeenth and eighteenth century the Lords of the Manor were the Reynolds family, which produced several distinguished politicians and judges.

During the 1914 Farm Workers strike, the village hosted  many talks by leading socialists including  Sylvia Pankhurst which attracted the highest turnout of over 2,000 people in July.

See also
The Hundred Parishes

References

External links

 Essex County Council Website
 Helions Bumpstead Parish Council Website

Villages in Essex
Civil parishes in Essex
Braintree District